Heartbeat is a British period drama series, based upon the "Constable" series of novels written by Nicholas Rhea, and produced by ITV Studios (formerly Yorkshire Television until it was merged by ITV) from 1992 until 2010. The following is a list of actors who served as cast members for the programme, grouped by category of the role they maintained, ordered by first appearance and listing the series they served in. This list also included actors who maintained recurring roles during the programme's history.

Main cast

Aidensfield and Ashfordly police cast

Medical staff cast

"Lovable rogue" cast

Aidensfield residents cast

Recurring characters
This section lists other characters who have appeared in more than one episode.

Jack Deam as Alan Maskell (1992).
Eileen O'Brien as Susan Maskell (credited as "Mrs Maskell") (1992).
Barrie Rutter as Walter Maskell (credited as "Mr Maskell") (1992).
Suzanne Hitchmough as Sandra  Murray (1992).
Shirley Stelfox as Mrs. Parkin (1992).
Anne Rye as Angela Hamilton ("Miss Hamilton") (1992–1993)
Andy Abrahams as unnamed local magistrate (1992–2003).
Mike Kelly as Malcolm Mostyn (1993).
Dean Gatiss as Graham Blaketon (1993–1994; 4 episodes).
Sue Holderness as Joan Forrester (1993; 2 episodes).
Russell Boulter as Inspector Crossley (1993–1994; 3 episodes).
Melanie Kilburn as Rosie Tinniswood (1993, 1995; 2 episodes).
Karen Meagher as Inspector Murchison (1994; 7 episodes)
Julia Lane as Christine Ferguson (1994; 6 episodes).
Lucy Robinson as Jennifer Radcliffe (1994; 3 episodes).
Emelye Robinson as Susan Radcliffe (1994; 2 episodes).
Lesley Nicol as Rita Stirling (1995; 3 episodes).
Jenny Agutter as Susannah Temple-Richards (1994, 1996; 2 episodes).
Harry Beety as Joseph Walker (1995; 9 episodes).
Diane Langton as Ruby Rowan (1995–97; 6 episodes).
William Ash as Joe Norton (1995; 2 episodes).
Mark Addy as "Norman" (1995–96; 2 episodes).
Mary Healey as Mrs Watkins (1996; 4 episodes).
Elizabeth Bennett as Joyce Jowett (1996–2009, 16 episodes).
Kenneth Cranham as Charlie Wallace (1996; 2 episodes).
Wanda Ventham as Fiona Weston (1996–1997, 4 episodes).
Steven Townsley as Billy Burke (1996, 3 episodes).
Dominic Rickhards as Steve Adams (1997; 5 episodes).
Carol Royle as Lady Patricia Brewster (1997–2003; 4 episodes).
Charlotte Mitchell as Bessie Bellamy (1997–1999; 4 episodes).
Stratford Johns as Cyril Isaiah Greengrass (1997, 1998; 2 episodes).
Alan Halsall as Trevor Chivers (1998–1999; 4 episodes).
Stefan Podolchuk as Stuart Chivers (1998–1999; 4 episodes).
Lesley Clare O'Neill as Doreen Chivers (1998–1999; 3 episodes).
Keeley Forsyth as Sue Driscoll (1998, 2000; 7 episodes).
Phillippa Wilson as Penny Craddock (1998–1999, 2000, 2002; 7 episodes).
Maggie Tagney as Gladys Smethurst (1998–2000; 5 episodes).
 Georgie Glen as Sgt Jennifer Nokes (2000–2001, 2003–2004, 2005, 2010).
Paul Opacic as Graham Rysinski (2000; 3 episodes).
Susan Jameson as Edwina Lambert (2000–2001; 2 episodes).
Barbara Bolton as Mrs Kellett (2001–2005; 9 episodes).
Francis Matthews as Dr James Alway (2002-2003; 4 episodes).
Christine Bottomley as Susie Ward (2002; 5 episodes). 
Beatrice Kelley as Olive Winstanley (6 episodes, 2003–2009).
Anita Carey as Barbara Crane (2 episodes, 2003).
Trevor Ray as William Barraclough (2 episodes, 2003–2004).
Jane Hazlegrove as Diane Crichard (4 episodes, 2004).
Helena Calvert as Clare Owen (4 episodes; 2005).
Victor McGuire as Brian Parker (2005, two episodes).
Tim Brooke-Taylor as Ronnie Smethers (2005, 2008, 2009; 4 episodes).
Lauren Drummond as Jane Black (2005–2006).
Gabriella Dixon as Susan Black (2005–2006).
Jack Ferguson as Peter Black (2005–2006).
Geoffrey Chater (British character actor) as Col Hal Clifford (2004, two episodes as different characters)

Guest stars
Over the years, a number of well-known guest stars have made one-off appearances in Heartbeat, either in cameo roles or more substantial single-episode parts. These include Richard Todd (legendary actor and Second World War hero), David Essex (as a traveller, or tinker), David McCallum, Charlotte Church, Michelle Dockery, John Nettles, Philip Jackson, Geraldine Newman, Siobhan Finneran, John Simm, Gary Barlow, David Dickinson, Todd Carty, Philip Glenister, Lulu, George Cole (as Albert "The Prof" Hallows), Ray Illingworth, Brian Close, Margaret Tyzack, Roy Dotrice, Roland Gift, Ralf Little, Dickie Bird, Daniel Craig, Clive Swift, Jean Alexander, Geoffrey Bayldon, Tim Brooke-Taylor (as Peggy Armstrong's solicitor), Twiggy, Benedict Cumberbatch, Noel Fitzpatrick, Leslie Phillips, Lindsey Coulson, George Layton, Gabrielle Drake, Robin Ellis, Leslie Grantham, George Baker, Paul Nicholas, Brigit Forsyth, Jan Francis, Peter Vaughan, Celia Imrie, Helen Lederer, singer Alan Price, Sam Kelly, Duncan Preston, Rodney Bewes, Bobby Ball, Tommy Cannon(uncredited), Russ Abbot, impressionist Jon Culshaw, Freddie Garrity (lead singer of Freddie and the Dreamers), Miranda Raison and Dave King as Aidensfield Station Master, Roy Hutton.

See also
 Heartbeat (British TV series)
 List of Heartbeat episodes

References

External links
"Heartbeat" - the key characters of the TV series
Heartbeat Online

Heartbeat (British TV series)
Heartbeat

fi:Sydämen asialla